The Redford Theatre in Detroit, Michigan has served as an entertainment venue since it opened on January 27, 1928. It is owned and operated by the Motor City Theatre Organ Society (MCTOS), a 501(c)(3) organization. Architects Ralph F. Shreive along with Verner, Wilheim, and Molby designed the 1,581-seat Redford in Exotic Revival style with Japanese motifs. On January 31, 1985, the Redford Theatre was accepted into the National Register of Historic Places. In January 2006, the Redford was proclaimed to be one of the city's ten best interiors by the Detroit Chapter of the American Institute of Architects.

At its opening, the theatre was hailed as "America's Most Unusual Suburban Playhouse".  The Redford Theatre, with its three-story grand foyer, Japanese-inspired decor and full-size stage, has been in continuous operation ever since.

This was fortunate, since it enabled the Redford Theatre and its 3 manual, 10 rank original Barton theatre organ, built by the Barton Organ Company, to escape the ravages of neglect that resulted in the destruction of many movie palaces throughout the Detroit area.

In 1931, The Redford Theatre's facility became more famous when its four furnaces were converted to oil fuel by Mobil Oil. Redford Theatre and Mobile Oil used this on their promotional brochures which proclaimed, "Largest structure in area converts to oil fuel." Ramon C. Bolf, who was also known as Ray Redford contributed the heating machinery and oil from his locally owned Mobil Oil fueling stations. 

The Redford Theatre originally opened as part of the Kunsky chain of movie theatres.  Later, it became part of the Goldberg Community Theatre chain.

In 1977, the owners felt that the theatre was no longer viable as a commercial operation and offered to sell the building to the nonprofit Motor City Theatre Organ Society (MCTOS) (a chapter of the American Theatre Organ Society), which had been leasing time at the theatre to present concerts and silent movies with organ accompaniment.  MCTOS purchased the theatre and continues to own and operate the theatre while restoring the interior designs that had been obliterated during World War II.

Out of over a hundred theatres in the Detroit area that contained pipe organs when they were built, the Redford Theatre is the only neighborhood theatre with its original theatre organ.

Programming 

Because of its location on the outskirts of Detroit, the spacious Redford often has not been a first-run movie theatre.  However, like many current second-run theatres, it has shown films that were market-tested at other movie houses. For example, on May 16, 1956, the Redford presented two prominent 1955 films - The Rose Tattoo and The Trouble with Harry.

When most of the movie theaters in the Detroit area were in the city of Detroit, the Redford Theatre screened many films that were first shown at one of the large theaters in the Grand Circus Park area of downtown Detroit.  Cimarron opened at the Redford on April 19, 1931, after its Detroit premiere at the Fox Theatre on February 5, 1931. In 1956, The Searchers opened at the Palms on May 18 and arrived at the Redford on August 15.

In the early 1930s, the Redford often showed three movies in one week (usually starting on Sundays, Wednesdays and Fridays). During one week in 1931, patrons enjoyed Joan Crawford and Clark Gable in Laughing Sinners (July 12–14), Lew Ayres in Iron Man (July 15–16) and Spencer Tracy in Six Cylinder Love (July 17–18).  Accompanying Redford films of the 1930s were comedy shorts (Laurel and Hardy, Charley Chase and Our Gang), cartoons (Mickey Mouse, Bugs Bunny and Mighty Mouse), golf instructional films with Bobby Jones and vaudeville acts.

In the 1950s, the Redford often showed double features, along with "Kiddie Matinees" on Saturday afternoons that included cartoons and special movies.  Occasionally, the Redford hosted Detroit area premieres, such as the December 25, 1956 opening of Friendly Persuasion, which was crowded out of the larger theaters by blockbusters like The Ten Commandments.

When movies started opening outside of downtown Detroit in the 1960s, the Redford was a first run theater for many prominent movies, including One Hundred and One Dalmatians (1961), Hud (1963), Von Ryan's Express (1965), You Only Live Twice (1967), Cool Hand Luke (1967), and The Graduate (1967).

In the 1970s, when socioeconomic forces closed many Detroit theaters and opened many others in the Detroit suburbs, the Redford went into decline and later was reborn with a still-running series of classic Hollywood movies. The Redford is one of the few remaining theaters mentioned in a September 11, 1981 Detroit News article about film repertory houses in the Detroit area.

Current film programming at the Redford Theatre consists of a bi-weekly movie series that ranges from silent films through the musicals of the 40s, 50s and 60s to some films from the 2000s.  Spring and Fall festivals featuring films of the Three Stooges have grown in popularity.  In addition to the classic film series and organ concerts produced by MCTOS, the theatre is available for rental by community groups wishing to produce their own shows.

Notes

References 

 Detroit Free Press; 1931, 1956, 1960-1969
 The Detroit News; 1931, 1956, 1981

External links 

 Redford Theatre
 Detroit Movie Palaces
 Cinema Treasures
 Michigan History-Michigan Nostalgia
 Cinema Tour

Cinemas and movie theaters in Michigan
Theatres on the National Register of Historic Places in Michigan
Music venues in Michigan
Event venues established in 1928
Theatres in Detroit
1928 establishments in Michigan
National Register of Historic Places in Detroit
Public venues with a theatre organ